Cydalima capriniodes is a moth in the family Crambidae. It was described by George Hampson in 1912. It is found in India (Punjab, Maharashtra, the Andamans) and Myanmar.

References

Moths described in 1912
Spilomelinae